Sir Edward Tyrrell, 1st Baronet (died 6 February 1691) was an Anglo-Irish landowner and Jacobite.

Tyrrell was High Sheriff of Westmeath in 1677 and Justice of the Peace for the county in 1681. On 20 May 1686 he was created a baronet, of Lynn in the Baronetage of England, with special remainder to his nephew Edward and his heirs male. A supporter of James II following the Glorious Revolution, Tyrrell was the Member of Parliament for Belturbet in the Patriot Parliament of the Irish House of Commons in 1689. James also appointed him as Supervisor of counties Cork and Waterford. 

In April 1690 he was given a commission in Luttrell’s Dragoons during the Williamite War in Ireland. Tyrrell was taken prisoner by Williamite forces at Cork later that year and was indicted of High Treason against William III, to whom, however, he had never sworn allegiance. Tyrrell died in February 1691 while awaiting trial as a prisoner, and was posthumously attainted of his title and estates. As such, his baronetcy is considered to have become extinct upon his death. 

He had married Eleanor, daughter of Sir Dudly Loftus of Rathfarnham as her third husband, and had by her one daughter, Katherine, who married Robert Edgworth. A portion of Tyrrell's property at Longwood, County Meath was restored to his daughter by special Act of Parliament in 1702.

References

Year of birth unknown
1691 deaths
17th-century Anglo-Irish people
Baronets in the Baronetage of England
High Sheriffs of County Westmeath
Irish Jacobites
Irish justices of the peace
Irish MPs 1689
Jacobite military personnel of the Williamite War in Ireland
Members of the Parliament of Ireland (pre-1801) for County Cavan constituencies
People convicted under a bill of attainder